The Ishim is a river running through Kazakhstan and Russia. It is a left tributary of the Irtysh. The Ishim is partly navigable in its lower reaches. The upper course of the Ishim passes through Astana, the capital of Kazakhstan. In Russia, the course of the river travels through a vast marshland, and has countless meanders and oxbow lakes. The river freezes from late November until March.

Main tributaries 
The largest tributaries of the Ishim are, from source to mouth:

 Qalqutan (right)
 Zhabay (right)
 Terisaqqan (left)
 Aqqanburlyq (right)
 Karasul (left)
 Barsuk (right)

In Astana 

According to the President of Kazakhstan, Nursultan Nazarbayev, Astana was chosen as the capital in part due to the presence of the river. The city is also divided into two sections, the Right (northern) Bank of the Ishim or the old town, and the Left (southern) Bank, where the new government buildings such as the Ak Orda, the House of the Government, and the Supreme Court are located, as well as many prestigious apartment and living complexes.

Since 1998, the Ishim in Astana has been actively managed, for flood management and maintaining water level, in order to provide for recreational use and ensure the showpiece appearance. It is dammed downstream of central Astana, keeping its level higher than it otherwise would be most of the time, while the river bottom has been made deeper, in order to let flood waters through faster. In central Astana, near the city park, there is now a public beach and pedalo boat rental; meanwhile, if the river had not been dammed, "citizens would have been able to walk across it". Another dam will be constructed upstream of the city, for better flood control.

The city authorities also have plans for further deepening the river, which will eventually allow small passenger boats to operate on a  section of the river through the nation's capital.

To maintain the desired level of water flow, water is pumped to the Ishim from the Irtysh, over the Irtysh–Karaganda Canal and a pipeline.

See also 
 Ishim Steppe
 Ust'-Ishim man

References 

Rivers of Kazakhstan
Rivers of Tyumen Oblast
Rivers of Omsk Oblast
International rivers of Asia